Lăpuș (formerly Lăpușul Românesc) is a commune in Maramureș County, Transylvania, Romania, on the Lăpuș River, at 12 km from the town of Târgu Lăpuș. It is composed of a single village, Lăpuș. Etymologically, its name appears to come from the Hungarian lápos (i.e. "flatland, bog, muddy place"), or from Proto-Slavic ло̀пӯх‎, a widespread name for burdock and other broad-leaf plants. Its existence is attested, under the name of Dragosfálva, in 1293, in an edict through which the land of Lápos is given by the king of Hungary to one Denis Tomaj, from the nation of the Patzinaks, although there are traces of habitation in the area as early as the Bronze Age. 
It was a famous anti-communist resistance area after World War II (1949-1953).

It has a beautiful old wooden church, built at the end of the 17th century, that was restored between 2002 and 2004.

Notes

External links 

 Older black and white pictures from Lăpuș - Photos by Magne Antonsen
 Panorama of the northern part of Lăpuș
 The old wooden church of Lăpuș
 The largest Bronze Age construction from South-Eastern Europe discovered by archaeologists in Lăpușul Românesc

Communes in Maramureș County
Localities in Transylvania